The Cutting of the Gordian Knot is an Ancient Greek legend associated with Alexander the Great in Gordium in Phrygia, who in 333 BC when challenged to unloose the complex Knot, of great local fame, instead of exercising genius in untangling it laboriously as expected, dramatically cut through it with his sword, thus exercising another form of mental genius, of a highly pragmatic and determined nature. It is thus used as a metaphor for a seemingly intractable problem which is solved by exercising an unexpectedly direct, novel, rule-bending, decisive and simple approach to the problem that removes the perceived constraints.

Legend 
The Phrygians were without a king, but an oracle at Telmissus (the ancient capital of Lycia) decreed that the next man to enter the city driving an ox-cart should become their king. A peasant farmer named Gordias drove into town on an ox-cart and was immediately declared king. Out of gratitude, his son Midas dedicated the ox-cart to the Phrygian god Sabazios (whom the Greeks identified with Zeus) and tied it to a post with an intricate knot of cornel bark (Cornus mas). The knot was later described by Roman historian Quintus Curtius Rufus as comprising "several knots all so tightly entangled that it was impossible to see how they were fastened".

The ox-cart still stood in the palace of the former kings of Phrygia at Gordium in the fourth century BC when Alexander the Great arrived, at which point Phrygia had been reduced to a satrapy, or province, of the Persian Empire. An oracle had declared that any man who could unravel its elaborate knots was destined to become ruler of all of Asia. Alexander the Great wanted to untie the knot but struggled to do so. He then reasoned that it would make no difference how the knot was loosed, so he drew his sword and sliced it in half with a single stroke. In an alternative version of the story, Alexander the Great loosed the knot by pulling the linchpin from the yoke.

Sources from antiquity agree that Alexander the Great was confronted with the challenge of the knot, but his solution is disputed. Both Plutarch and Arrian relate that, according to Aristobulus, Alexander the Great pulled the linchpin from the pole to which the yoke was fastened, exposing the two ends of the cord and allowing him to untie the knot without having to cut through it. Some classical scholars regard this as more plausible than the popular account. Literary sources of the story include Arrian (Anabasis Alexandri 2.3), Quintus Curtius (3.1.14), Justin's epitome of Pompeius Trogus (11.7.3), and Aelian's De Natura Animalium 13.1.

Alexander the Great later went on to conquer Asia as far as the Indus and the Oxus, thus fulfilling the prophecy.

Interpretations 
The knot may have been a religious knot-cipher guarded by priests and priestesses. Robert Graves suggested that it may have symbolised the ineffable name of Dionysus that, knotted like a cipher, would have been passed on through generations of priests and revealed only to the kings of Phrygia. 

The ox-cart suggests a longer voyage, rather than a local journey, perhaps linking Alexander the Great with an attested origin-myth in Macedon, of which Alexander is most likely to have been aware. Based on this origin myth, the new dynasty was not immemorially ancient, but had widely remembered origins in a local, but non-priestly "outsider" class, represented by Greek reports equally as an eponymous peasant or the locally attested, authentically Phrygian in his ox-cart. Roller (1984) separates out authentic Phrygian elements in the Greek reports and finds a folk-tale element and a religious one, linking the dynastic founder (with the cults of "Zeus" and Cybele)

Other Greek myths legitimize dynasties by right of conquest (compare Cadmus), but in this myth the stressed legitimising oracle suggests that the previous dynasty was a race of priest-kings allied to the unidentified oracular deity.

See also

Explanatory notes

References

External links 
 
 

Alexander the Great in legend
Culture of Phrygia
Greek mythology
Metaphors
Mythological knots
Philosophical analogies
Puzzles